Mawade Wade (28 March 1928 – 14 September 2004) was a Senegalese football manager.

Career
Following a career as a teacher, Wade moved into football, founding Réveil de Saint-Louis in 1950. Wade managed the club until 1965, becoming technical director of the Senegal national team the following year. In 1970, Wade joined the Confederation of African Football committee. 

During the late 1980s, Wade managed Senegal, taking charge of the team at the 1987 All-Africa Games and the 1988 Amílcar Cabral Cup. In March 1990, Wade took up a seat at the Confederation of African Football's executive committee. Wade lost his position on the executive committee in March 1994, however was re-elected in 1998 and 2002.

Personal life and death
Politically, Wade identified himself as a leftist, an anti-imperialist and a pan-Africanist.

On 11 August 2002, Wade suffered a stroke. On 14 September 2004, Wade died in his hometown of Saint-Louis. Following his death, the Stade de Linguère was renamed to the Stade Mawade Wade.

References

1928 births
2004 deaths
Sportspeople from Saint-Louis, Senegal
Senegalese schoolteachers
Senegal national football team managers
Senegalese football managers
Senegalese expatriate footballers
Senegalese pan-Africanists
Members of the CAF Executive Committee